Torbeyevsky District (Tarbejeń ajmak; , Torbejbuje) is an administrative and municipal district (raion), one of the twenty-two in the Republic of Mordovia, Russia. It is located in the southwest of the republic. Its administrative center is the urban locality (a work settlement) of Torbeyevo. As of the 2010 Census, the total population of the district was 21,479, with the population of Torbeyevo accounting for 43.6% of that number.

Administrative and municipal status
Within the framework of administrative divisions, Torbeyevsky District is one of the twenty-two in the republic. It is divided into one work settlement (an administrative division with the administrative center in the work settlement (inhabited locality) of Torbeyevo), and fifteen selsoviets, all of which comprise fifty-three rural localities. As a municipal division, the district is incorporated as Torbeyevsky Municipal District. Torbeyevo Work Settlement is incorporated into an urban settlement, and the fifteen selsoviets are incorporated into fifteen rural settlements within the municipal district. The work settlement of Torbeyevo serves as the administrative center of both the administrative and municipal district.

References

Notes

Sources

Districts of Mordovia
 
